Jeff Wilson is a British auto racing driver and expert in race car preparation. In 1978 along with Brian Holliday, he set up the HWR Motorsport team. Wilson is best known for competing in the 1991 British Touring Car Championship with a self prepared Vauxhall Belmont. Entering three rounds, he scored no championship points, but finished a creditable eleventh place at Donington Park. He has entered 28 events in his career, finishing 76% of them.

He most recently competed in the BRSCC Race TV Open Sportscar Series in 2009.

Racing record

Complete British Touring Car Championship results
(key) (Races in bold indicate pole position) (Races in italics indicate fastest lap)

References

External links
HWR Motorsport official site

Living people
British Touring Car Championship drivers
English racing drivers
Year of birth missing (living people)